The Saskatchewan Order of Merit is a civilian honour for merit in the Canadian province of Saskatchewan. Instituted in 1985 by Lieutenant Governor Frederick Johnson, on the advice of the Cabinet under Premier Grant Devine, the order is administered by the Governor-in-Council and is intended to honour current or former Saskatchewan residents for conspicuous achievements in any field, being thus described in law as the highest honour amongst all others conferred by the Saskatchewan Crown.

Structure and appointment
The Saskatchewan Order of Merit is intended to honour any Canadian citizen currently or formerly resident in Saskatchewan who has demonstrated a high level of individual excellence and achievement in any field, improving the "social, cultural and economic well-being of the province and its residents"; the process of finding such individuals begins with call for nominations put out each spring by the Saskatchewan Honours Advisory Council. There are no limitations on population, but only ten new members may be created each year.

The process of finding qualified individuals begins with call for nominations put out each spring by the Saskatchewan Honours Advisory Council, which then makes its selected recommendations to the lieutenant governor. Posthumous nominations are accepted within one year of the date of death and in 2001 the Provincial Emblems and Honours Act was amended to allow for honorary membership in the order, granted to those who are neither current nor former residents of Saskatchewan; Prince Charles, Prince of Wales, was the first honorary member of the Saskatchewan Order of Merit, having been appointed on 24 April 2001. The lieutenant governor, who is ex officio a member and the Chancellor of the Saskatchewan Order of Merit and remains a member following his or her departure from viceregal office, then makes all appointments into the fellowship's single grade of membership by letters patent bearing the viceroyal sign-manual and the Great Seal of the province; thereafter, the new Members are entitled to use the post-nominal letters SOM and have their portrait added to the Athabasca Gallery at the Saskatchewan Legislative Building.

Insignia
Upon admission into the Saskatchewan Order of Merit, members are presented with the order's insignia at a ceremony held either at Government House in Regina or at a venue in Saskatoon. According to The Provincial Emblems and Honours Act, which stipulates the design of the order's badges and ribbon and how they are worn, the main emblem of the order is a silver medallion in the form of a six pointed star—an abstract rendition of a western red lilly, the province's official flower. The obverse is coated in white enamel and bears the escutcheon of Her Majesty's Arms in right of Saskatchewan within a circular ribbon that displays the provincial motto—Multis E Gentibus Vires (From many peoples strength)—all topped by a St. Edward's Crown symbolizing the Canadian monarch's role as the fount of honour. This medallion is hung from a ribbon with a green-gold-green, vertical striped pattern, at the collar for men, and on a bow pinned at the left chest for women. Members will also receive for wear on casual clothing a lapel pin in the form of a stylized western red lily bearing at St. Edward's Crown.

Inductees
The following are some notable appointees of the Saskatchewan Order of Merit:

 Freda Ahenakew , author and academic, appointed 2005
 John Hall Archer , librarian and historian, appointed 1987
 Don Atchison SOM, Mayor of Saskatoon, appointed 2019
 Lorne Allan Babiuk , immunologist, molecular virologist, and vaccinologist, appointed 2003
 Marcel Alter Baltzan , physician and nephrologist, appointed 1999
 Lloyd Ingram Barber , Chancellor of the University of Regina, appointed 1995
 Byrna Barclay , author, appointed 2004
 Edward Dmytro Bayda , Chief Justice of Saskatchewan, appointed 2008
 Allan Emrys Blakeney , Premier of Saskatchewan, appointed 2000
 Elizabeth Winifred Brewster , poet and academic, appointed 2008
Sharon Butala , writer and conservationist, appointed 2009
 Angus Daniel Campbell , founder of the Northern Ontario Hockey Association, appointed 1996
 Maria Campbell , author, playwright, broadcaster, filmmaker, appointed 2005
 Roger Colenso Carter , Dean, University of Saskatchewan College of Law, appointed 1998
 Edward Milton Culliton , Chief Justice of Saskatchewan, appointed 1988
 Donald Grant Devine, Premier of Saskatchewan, appointed 2009
 Thomas Clement Douglas , Premier of Saskatchewan, appointed 1985
 Joseph Fafard , sculpture artist, appointed 2002
 Walter Henry Farquharson , Moderator of the United Church of Canada, appointed 2007
 David Leon Kaplan , professor, performer, and conductor, appointed 2006
 Dorothy Knowles , landscape artist, appointed 1987.
 John Victor Hicks , poet, appointed 1992
 Frederick W. Hill , appointed 1999, businessman
 Gordon MacMurchy , politician, appointed 1999
 Peggy McKercher , Chancellor of the University of Saskatchewan, appointed 2001
 Kenneth Alexander Mitchell , actor, appointed 2001
 Robert Joseph Ogle , Roman Catholic priest, broadcaster, and politician, appointed 1995
Thelma Pepper , artist, appointed 2018
 William Perehudoff , artist, appointed 1994
 Elizabeth Raum, oboist and composer, appointed 2010
 Edward Rawlinson , broadcaster, appointed 1989
 Garnet "Sam" Richardson , Curler, appointed 2005
 Roy John Romanow , Premier of Saskatchewan, appointed 2003
 Allen Sapp , artist, appointed 1985
 Sandra Marie Schmirler , Olympic athlete, posthumously appointed 2000
 Morris Cyril Shumiatcher , civil rights lawyer, appointed 1996
 John William Tranter Spinks , appointed 1996
 Savella Stechishin , home economist and writer, appointed 1998
 Anne Szumigalski , poet, appointed 1989
 Guy Clarence Vanderhaeghe , author, appointed 2003
 Prince Charles, Prince of Wales , heir apparent to the Canadian throne, appointed 2001 (later Charles III)
 Ernest Walker , archaeologist and academic, appointed 2001
 Pamela Wallin , television journalist and diplomat, appointed 1999
 James Vernon Weisgerber , prelate of the Roman Catholic Church, appointed 2005
 Prince Edward, Duke of Edinburgh , member of the Canadian Royal Family, appointed 2005
 Stephen Worobetz , Lieutenant Governor of Saskatchewan, appointed 1999
 Clifford Emerson Wright , Mayor of Saskatoon, appointed 1999
 Sylvia Fedoruk, Lieutenant Governor of Saskatchewan, appointed 1986

See also
 Canadian order of precedence (decorations and medals)
 State decoration
 Symbols of Saskatchewan

References

External links
 Saskatchewan Order of Merit webpage

Order of Merit
Provincial and territorial orders of Canada
1985 establishments in Saskatchewan
Orders of merit